This is a list of notable people who were born in or have been residents of the town of Newcastle-under-Lyme, in the county of Staffordshire, England.

Earlier centuries 
Humphrey Wollrich (1633–1707), Quaker writer
Philip Astley (1742–1814), equestrian, inventor and father of the modern circus
Silvester Harding (1745–1809), artist and publisher, who joined a company of strolling actors at age 14
John James Blunt (1794–1855), Anglican priest who wrote studies of the early Church.

19th century 
Henry Moseley (1801–1872), churchman, mathematician, and scientist
Joseph Mayer (1803–1886), goldsmith, antiquary and collector
Emma Darwin (née Wedgwood) (1808–1896), granddaughter of Josiah Wedgwood and wife of Charles Darwin
Hungerford Crewe, 3rd Baron Crewe FSA, FRS (1812–1894), landowner and peer, inherited the Jacobean Crewe Hall and failed to prevent the construction of a Silverdale and Madeley Railway Company line
Sir Oliver Lodge (1851–1940), physicist, inventor and writer
Arthur Howard Heath TD (1856–1930), industrialist, cricketer, Rugby Union international and local Conservative MP
Sir Joseph Cook, GCMG, PC (1860 in Silverdale – 1947), worked in the local coalmines before emigrating in 1885; Prime Minister of Australia, 1913–1914  
Grand Duke Michael Mikhailovich of Russia, (1861–1929), lived in Keele Hall in 1900–1909. 
Arnold Bennett (1867–1931), writer
Ada Nield Chew (1870–1945), suffragist
Alfred Herbert Richardson (1874–1951), policeman and Chief Constable of Newcastle-under-Lyme 1901-1903
Oliver William Foster Lodge (1878–1955), poet and author born in Newcastle
Fanny Deakin (1883–1968), local politician born in Silverdale, who campaigned for child nourishment and maternity care.
Vera Brittain (1893–1970), author, reformer and pacifist, and mother of Shirley Williams
Reginald Mitchell (1895–1937), designer of the Spitfire fighter plane

20th century 
E. S. Turner (1909–2006), journalist and author, went to school in the town. 
Fred Kite (1921–1993), only Second World War British soldier to receive the Military Medal three times 
Freddie Garrity (1936–2006), singer, lived in the town near the end of his life. 
Jackie Trent (1940–2015), singer, songwriter and actress 
Neil Baldwin (born 1946), clown, Stoke City kit-man and honorary graduate of Keele University
Kevin John Dunn (1950–2008), twelfth Roman Catholic Bishop of Hexham and Newcastle 
Professor Alan Sinclair (born 1952), clinical scientist and diabetes specialist 
Dylan Waldron (born 1953), artist in traditional techniques such as painting in egg tempera and silverpoint 
Janet Bloomfield (1953–2007), peace and disarmament campaigner
Fran Unsworth (born 1957), journalist, head of BBC News since January 2018
Emma Amos (born 1964), actress
Andrew Van Buren (living), illusionist showman, co-founder of the Philip Astley Project
Hugh Dancy, (born 1975), actor
Charlotte Salt, (born 1985), actress as Sam Nicholls in Casualty (TV series)Dan Croll, (born 1990) singer and songwriter
Leon Cooke (born 1991), actor, singer and dancer
Wes Nelson (born 1998), singer and reality television star
Daniel Jones (born 1973), former professional ballet dancer with English National Ballet, choreographer, producer, documentary maker, and now doing wonders for the arts in Newcastle-under-Lyme 

 Notable sports people 
Dick Ray (1876–1952) professional footballer and manager with Port Vale and Manchester City
Frederick Bailey (1919–1985), left-handed English cricketer 
Don Ratcliffe (1934–2014), footballer with Stoke City
Mike Pejic (born 1950), footballer with Stoke City and Everton 
Ian Moores (1954–1998) footballer with Stoke City and Tottenham Hotspur 
Robbie Earle (born 1965), footballer with Port Vale and Wimbledon
Graham Shaw (born 1967) footballer with Stoke City 
Dominic Cork, (born 1971) cricketer
Simon Wakefield (born 1974), professional golfer
Lizzie Neave (born 1987), slalom canoeist in women's kayak, competed in the 2012 Summer Olympics 
Oliver Sadler (born 1987), first-class cricketer
Peter Wilshaw (born 1987), cricketer
Eddie Hall (born 1988), professional strongman
Danielle Wyatt (born 1991), professional England cricketer
Curtis Nelson (born 1993), footballer for Plymouth Argyle F.C. 
Aaron Ramsdale (born 1998), footballer

 Notable politicians 
Sir John Merrick (1584–1659), politician and Newcastle-under-Lyme MP
Robert Needham, 2nd Viscount Kilmorey (1587/88–1653), supporter of Charles I;  MP for Newcastle-under-Lyme in the Addled Parliament in 1614.
Sir Richard Leveson (1598–1661), MP for Newcastle in the Long Parliament 
Samuel Terrick (1602–1675), local politician. In 1658 he went bankrupt for £20,000.
Major-General Thomas Harrison (1606–1660) sided with Parliament in the English Civil War. In 1649 he signed the death warrant of Charles I and in 1660, after the Restoration, was found guilty of regicide and hanged, drawn and quartered.
Sir Richard Lloyd (1606–1676), English politician who sat in the House of Commons variously between 1628 and 1676. In April 1640, Lloyd was MP for Newcastle-under-Lyme in the Short Parliament.
Sir Alfred Seale Haslam (1844–1927) engineer, three times Mayor of Newcastle, MP for Newcastle-under-Lyme, 1900–1906
Josiah Wedgwood, 1st Baron Wedgwood (1872–1943), Josiah Wedgwood IV'', great-great-grandson of Josiah Wedgwood and Liberal MP for Newcastle-under-Lyme 1906-1919, then its Labour MP 1919-1942
Sir Oswald Mosley (1896–1980), founder of British Union of Fascists lived in Apedale Hall in early 1900s
John David Mack (c. 1899–1957), Labour Party MP for Newcastle-under-Lyme, 1942–1951.
Stephen Swingler (1915–1969) Labour MP for Stafford, 1945–1950, and for Newcastle-under-Lyme 1951–1969
John Golding (1931–1999), Labour MP for Newcastle-under-Lyme 1969-1986
Llin Golding, Baroness Golding (born 1933), Labour MP for Newcastle-under-Lyme 1986-2001
Jeremy Lefroy (born 1959) Westlands councillor, MP for Stafford since 2010
Paul Farrelly (born 1962), MP for Newcastle-under-Lyme and journalist
Karen Bradley (born 1970), MP for Staffordshire Moorlands and Secretary of State for Culture, Media and Sport
Aaron Bell (born 1980) politician, MP for Newcastle-under-Lyme since 2019
Gareth Snell (born 1986), graduate of Keele University 2008, leader of the Newcastle-under-Lyme Borough Council 2012–2014 and MP for Stoke-on-Trent Central since 2017

References

Newcastle-under-Lyme